Burnetiidae is an extinct family of biarmosuchian therapsids that lived in the Permian period whose fossils are found in South Africa and Russia. It contains Bullacephalus, Burnetia, Mobaceras, Niuksenitia, Paraburnetia and Proburnetia.

References

Burnetiamorphs
Guadalupian first appearances
Lopingian extinctions
Prehistoric therapsid families
Taxa named by Robert Broom